Tomáš Lovásik (born 31 July 1974) is a Slovak former football goalkeeper. He spent most of his career at Czech football clubs, FK Jablonec and SK Sigma Olomouc, playing over 100 matches in the Gambrinus liga.

External links
 
 Guardian Football

Slovak footballers
SK Sigma Olomouc players
FK Jablonec players
FC Spartak Trnava players
FC Fastav Zlín players
Slovak Super Liga players
Czech First League players
1974 births
Living people
Expatriate footballers in the Czech Republic
MŠK Rimavská Sobota players
AS Trenčín players
Association football goalkeepers